is a 2009 comedy-drama film directed by Cellin Gluck that is a remake of the 2004 Academy Award-nominated film Sideways. Unlike its predecessor that was set in the Santa Barbara wine country, it is primarily set in the Napa Valley wine region.

Plot
Michio Saito is a middle-aged Japanese screenwriter with little success. He is a former foreign student who returns to California to attend the wedding of his best friend, Daisuke Uehara, to an Alli, an American. Uehara is a former actor who has lived in California since college and is now a restaurant manager. Before the wedding, the two men take one last bachelor trip to the Napa Valley wine country, where they meet a woman that Saito once tutored and admired, Mayuko Tanaka, and her barista friend, Mina Parker. Tanaka and Saito rekindle their acquaintance, and Parker and Uehara become romantically entangled.

Cast
The actors include:
 Fumiyo Kohinata as Michio Saito
 Katsuhisa Namase as Daisuke Uehara
 Kyôka Suzuki as Mayuko Tanaka
 Rinko Kikuchi as Mina Parker
 Anna Easteden as Alli

References

Further reading

External links
 
 
 
 

2009 films
2009 comedy-drama films
2000s road comedy-drama films
20th Century Fox films
American road comedy-drama films
Films about wine
Films set in California
Films shot in California
English-language Japanese films
Fuji TV
Japanese remakes of American films
Japanese comedy-drama films
Japanese road movies
Midlife crisis films
2000s Japanese-language films
2000s English-language films
2009 multilingual films
Japanese multilingual films
American multilingual films
2000s American films
2000s Japanese films
Films produced by Kazutoshi Wadakura